The 88th Indian Infantry Brigade was an infantry brigade formation of the Indian Army during World War II. It was formed in September 1942, at Chittagong to protect the 14th Indian Infantry Division's lines of communications and was disbanded on 8 May 1943. It was commanded by Brigadier Lechmere Thomas.

Formation
5th Battalion, 9th Jat Regiment September 1942 to April 1943	
1st Battalion, 16th Punjab Regiment September 1942 to February 1943
14th Battalion, 12th Frontier Force Regiment October 1942 to May 1943

See also

 List of Indian Army Brigades in World War II

References

British Indian Army brigades
Military units and formations in Burma in World War II